Sonia Cheng Chi-Man (traditional Chinese: 鄭志雯; simplified Chinese: 郑志雯) is a Hong Kong business executive. She is the CEO of privately held Rosewood Hotel Group, executive director of the Hong Kong-listed New World Development (HKG:0017) and the vice-chairman of Chow Tai Fook Jewellery Group (HKG: 1929). She is also appointed as an independent non-executive director of The Hongkong and Shanghai Banking Corporation and an independent director of Primavera Capital Acquisition Corporation, a company listed on the New York Stock Exchange.. She is also a member of the Hong Kong Tourism Board (November 2020 – present). She is the daughter of Hong Kong property developer Henry Cheng and granddaughter of real estate and jewelry billionaire Cheng Yu-tung.

Sonia Cheng was named to Forbes Top 40 under 40  and Bloomberg Businessweek’s The Bloomberg 50  in 2018.

Early life and education 
Cheng was born in 1980. She is the second child of Henry Cheng, and among her siblings are business executive Adrian Cheng, Brian Cheng, and Christopher Cheng.
She studied at St. Pauls’ Co-educational College in Hong Kong and Taft School in the United States. She holds a Bachelor of Arts Degree with a concentration in Applied Mathematics from Harvard University.

Career 
Cheng joined Morgan Stanley and Warburg Pincus working in their U.S. and Hong Kong offices. In 2008, she joined New World Group and became chief executive officer of Rosewood Hotel Group overseeing five distinct hotel brands, including Rosewood Hotels & Resorts®, New World Hotel & Resorts, KHOS, Carlyle & Co and Asaya. In her capacity as a business executive, she promotes environmental-friendly and sustainable policies.

Cheng joined Chow Tai Fook Jewellery Group in April 2019 as a non-executive director, re-designated as an executive director in April 2021 and became vice-chairman and executive director in June 2022. She is responsible for strategic direction and corporate transformation of the company as well as its branding and high jewellery and HEARTS ON FIRE businesses.

Boards and positions 

 CEO of privately held Rosewood Hotel Group 
 Executive director of the Hong Kong-listed New World Development.
 Executive director of New World China Land, 
 Vice-chairman of Chow Tai Fook Jewellery Group. 
 Independent non-executive director of The Hongkong and Shanghai Banking Corporation, 
 Chairman of the advisory committee of the School of Hotel and Tourism Management at The Chinese University of Hong Kong (2014–Present), 
 Council Member of the The Chinese University of Hong Kong 
 Chairman of the advisory committee of the School of Hotel and Tourism Management at The Chinese University of Hong Kong (2014–Present), 
 Member of the advisory committee of the School of Hotel & Tourism Management at The Hong Kong Polytechnic University (2014-2020)

Awards and recognitions 
International Hospitality Institute Global 100: 100 Most Powerful People in Global Hospitality in 2022.
Bloomberg Businessweek: The Bloomberg 50 in 2018
 Fortune: 40 under 40 in 2018
Fast Company: Most Creative People in Business 2018
 Conde Nast Traveller China: Movers and Shakers List 2018
 Architectural Digest China: People of the Year 2018
 Gafencu: 300 Most Powerful People in Hong Kong 
Prestige Hong Kong: 40 under 40 in 2016
 Forbes Asia: Asia's 50 Power Businesswomen  in 2015 & 2016

Personal life 
Cheng actively participates in charity work including New World Development and Chow Tai Fook charity projects in Hong Kong and Mainland China.  Cheng is married to Mr. Paulo Pong with four children.

References

Living people
1980 births
Hong Kong women in business
21st-century Hong Kong women
Hong Kong hoteliers
Hong Kong chief executives
Harvard College alumni